The fastest times in the swimming events at the Southeast Asian Swimming Championships are designated as the Southeast Asian Swimming Championships records in swimming in seniors. The events are held in a long course (50 m) pool.

Championships records
All records were set in finals unless noted otherwise. All times are swum in a long-course (50m) pool.

Men

Women

See also
 List of Southeast Asian Games records in swimming

References

Southeast Asian Championships